Elbe 17 is the third largest dry dock in Germany, located in Hamburg (Germany) and administrated by shipbuilding company Blohm + Voss. Completed in 1942 at a length of 351 meters and a width of 59 meters. It was originally intended for the construction of the massive H-class battleships.

During World War II, it was used for repair work only and also served as an air shelter (housing up to 6000 people). After the war, the huge floatable metal gate was scrapped and the dock served as a berth. The British occupation forces originally planned to demolish the dock in January 1950, but popular protests and fears that the demolition would damage the nearby tunnel under the Elbe caused the dock to be preserved.

On December 12, 1967, construction of a new gate was completed and the first ship to enter the dock was the 190,000 ton tanker . Today, the dock is primarily used for refurbishing and repairing ships, although it can also be used for the construction of new vessels. The dock was notably used to perform maintenance on very large ships such as the container ship Sovereign Maersk (347 m long and 42.8 m wide), the cruise ship Freedom of the Seas (339 m long, 56 m wide), and the Queen Mary 2 (66,000 t, 345 m long, 41 m wide)

References

External links

Buildings and structures in Hamburg-Mitte
Economy of Hamburg
Drydocks